Eteobalea siciliae is a moth in the family Cosmopterigidae. It is found on Sicily, as well as in Algeria and Turkey.

The wingspan is about 13–14 mm. Adults have been recorded in June and from August to the beginning of September.

References

Moths described in 1966
Eteobalea
Moths of Europe